Maryanne is a given name. Notable people with the name include:

Maryanne Amacher (1938–2009), American composer and installation artist
Maryanne Connelly (born 1945), Democratic politician in New Jersey and the former mayor of Fanwood
Maryanne Demasi, Australian science reporter and presenter with ABC's Catalyst
Maryanne Ellison Simmons (born 1949), American artist and writer, and the wife of baseball player Ted Simmons
Maryanne J. George, American Christian musician
MaryAnne Golon, American journalist and magazine photography editor
Maryanne Keller, Colorado State Senator
Maryanne Kusaka, American politician and former Mayor of the County of Kaua'i
Maryanne Lewis, American businesswoman and former Massachusetts State Representative
Maryanne Petrilla, currently the Luzerne County Commissioner Chairperson
MaryAnne Sapio, Washington DC lobbyist, and former beauty queen
MaryAnne Tebedo (born 1936), Colorado State Senator from Colorado Springs
Maryanne Tipler, New Zealand mathematics textbook author
Maryanne Trump Barry (born 1937), judge on the United States Court of Appeals for the Third Circuit and older sister of President Donald Trump
Maryanne Vollers, American author, journalist and ghostwriter
Maryanne Wolf, American educator and author who studies the origins of reading and language-learning
Maryanne Zéhil, filmmaker and a producer from Beirut

See also 
Marianne (given name)
Mary Ann (disambiguation), includes a list of people with given name Mary Ann